China Clean Energy, Inc. (OTC: CCGY), through its wholly owned subsidiary Fujian Zhongde Technology Co., Ltd. (“Fujian Zhongde”), is a biodiesel and specialty chemical producer operating in The People's Republic of China and selling products both domestically there and worldwide.

Biodiesel
The company uses waste vegetable oils, such as cotton seed leavings, and yellow grease, as feedstocks, processing them through proprietary technologies to produce biodiesel for local consumption and a variety of green chemicals for sale worldwide. 

In early 2008, the company secured private funding through a special stock offering to create a 100,000 metric ton annual capacity biodiesel plant.  The company's current plants are approximately one-tenth of that size.

Specialty chemicals
The company produces by products of biodiesel and various specialty chemicals.  Because these chemicals are produced from renewable feedstock, they can be considered "green" and sold for a premium in some markets. 

Chemicals listed include: Monomer Acid, Stearic, Dimer Acid, Printing Inks, Dimer-Based Polyamide Hot Melt Adhesive, Low Molecular Weight Liquor Polyamide Resins, Polyamide Hot-Melt Adhesive, Alcohol-soluble Polyamide Resins, Benzene-Soluble Polyamide Resins, and Bio Heating Fuel.

See also

 Bioenergy in China

References

External links
 Official website

Biodiesel producers
Renewable energy in China
Oil companies of China
Energy companies established in 1995
Renewable resource companies established in 1995
Chinese companies established in 1995